is an upcoming American thriller film that began filming in July 2022, written, directed, and produced by Emerald Fennell.

Premise
The film depicts the lives of a grand, aristocratic English family.

Cast
 Barry Keoghan
 Jacob Elordi
 Rosamund Pike
 Richard E. Grant
 Alison Oliver
 Archie Madekwe
 Millie Kent
 Paul Rhys
 Reece Shearsmith
 Isabella de Ferrars
 Ewan Mitchell
 Sadie Soverall
 Carey Mulligan
 Richard Cotterell
 Kiran Nair

Production
Saltburn is the second film directed by Emerald Fennell after Promising Young Woman (2020). By January 2022, Margot Robbie's LuckyChap Entertainment was in talks to produce. In May 2022, Josey McNamara, Tom Ackerley, and Robbie were confirmed as producers and Rosamund Pike, Jacob Elordi, and Barry Keoghan joined the cast. Carey Mulligan was revealed to be part of the cast in December.

Filming began on July 16, 2022, with Linus Sandgren serving as cinematographer.

References

External links
 

Upcoming films
American thriller films